Anzère is a small village in the canton of Valais, Switzerland, located in the municipality of Ayent and close to Sion and Crans. A south-facing purpose-built resort in traditional Swiss architectural style.

The Swiss ski resort of Anzère has direct access to 58 km of downhill skiing, with 15 individual pistes, served by 13 ski lifts.

Skiing
The ski slopes in Anzère cover about 58 kilometers (the longest run being Les Rousses at over 5 km long) with 1 cablecar, 3 chair lifts, and 7 drag lifts. There are several self-service restaurants on the mountain, and the entire area is known as Télé-Anzère.

Town Centre
Facilities in and around Anzère's 'Place du Village' include both indoor and outdoor swimming pools, a supermarket, multiple hotels, bars and nightclubs, as well as many restaurants and clothes shops. The 'Place du Village' is a pedestrian area right in the heart of the village, containing most of Anzère's cafes and restaurants. There is also an internet cafe, a crèperie and a children's play area.

External links

Anzère

Villages in Valais
Ski areas and resorts in Switzerland